The You Are Egyptian Party  is a political party that calls for the a civil state based on the separation of powers between the judicial, legislative, and executive authorities.

References

2011 establishments in Egypt
Political parties established in 2011
Political parties in Egypt